Sabulodes edwardsata is a species of geometrid moth in the family Geometridae. It is found in North America.

The MONA or Hodges number for Sabulodes edwardsata is 7004.

References

Further reading

External links

 

Ourapterygini
Articles created by Qbugbot
Moths described in 1886